
Gmina Zapolice is a rural gmina (administrative district) in Zduńska Wola County, Łódź Voivodeship, in central Poland.

The gmina contains part of the protected area called Warta-Widawka Landscape Park.

Villages
Gmina Zapolice contains the villages and settlements of Beleń, Beleń-Kolonia, Branica, Branica-Kolonia, Holendry Paprockie, Jelno, Jeziorko, Kalinowa, Marcelów, Marżynek, Młodawin Dolny, Młodawin Górny, Paprotnia, Pstrokonie, Ptaszkowice, Rembieszów-Kolonia, Rojków, Strońsko, Swędzieniejewice, Świerzyny, Woźniki, Wygiełzów, Zamoście and Zapolice.

Neighbouring gminas
Gmina Zapolice is bordered by the town of Zduńska Wola and by the gminas of Burzenin, Sędziejowice, Sieradz, Widawa and Zduńska Wola.

References
Polish official population figures 2006

Zapolice
Zduńska Wola County